James Frith (1860-1946), was an English bowls player who competed in the 1930 British Empire Games.

Bowls career
At the 1930 British Empire Games he won the gold medal in the rinks (fours) event with Ernie Gudgeon, Albert Hough and James Edney.

He was a 1921 rinks (fours) National Champion bowling for the Belgrave Bowls Club, Northumberland.

Personal life
He was an Life Assurance agent by trade and lived in Newcastle upon Tyne.

References

English male bowls players
Bowls players at the 1930 British Empire Games
Commonwealth Games gold medallists for England
Commonwealth Games medallists in lawn bowls
1860 births
1946 deaths
Medallists at the 1930 British Empire Games